Palpita limbata is a moth in the family Crambidae. It is found on Rennell Island and Guadalcanal, as well as in Australia, where it has been recorded from Queensland and New South Wales.

The forewings are translucent white with a small spot and a brown costa. The wing margins have a narrow interrupted dark brown edge.

References

Palpita
Moths described in 1886
Moths of Oceania